Diaphus rivatoni is a species of lanternfish found in the Pacific Ocean.

Size

Etymology
The fish is named in honor of Bourret's friend and colleague of 20 years Jacques Rivaton (1921–2009), of the Office de la Recherche Scientifique et Technique d’Outre-Mer, New Caledonia, who has devoted much effort to the identification of Diaphus from the Western Pacific.

References

Myctophidae
Taxa named by Philippe Bourret
Fish described in 1985